Raorchestes manohari is a species of frog of the genus Raorchestes found in Bonacaud in the Western Ghats of Kerala in India. The species is named after T. M. Manoharan, Principal Chief Conservator of Forests, Kerala.

References

External links
 

manohari
Frogs of India
Endemic fauna of the Western Ghats
Amphibians described in 2011